Rolf Thomas Perlmann, (March 2, 1959, Stockholm, Sweden) is a professor of molecular developmental biology at Karolinska Institute. In 2006, he became a member of the Nobel Assembly at the Karolinska Institute. He became an adjunct member of Karolinska Institutet's Nobel Committee in 2008 and was then elected in 2012. He has been Secretary for the Nobel Committee for Physiology or Medicine since 2016.

References 

Developmental biologists
Academic staff of the Karolinska Institute
Scientists from Stockholm
1959 births
Living people